USS Kittery may refer to the following ships of the United States Navy:

 , was launched as the German transport Praesident on 30 November 1905, taken over by the US Navy on 14 May 1917 and scrapped in 1937
 , was launched as PC-1201 on 14 February 1943, renamed Kittery on 15 February 1956 and sold on 9 October 1959

United States Navy ship names